Slingshot is a 2005 American independent crime film directed  by Jay Alaimo and written by Alaimo & Matt Fiorello and Matthew Quinn Martin. The film stars David Arquette, Thora Birch, Balthazar Getty and Julianna Margulies.

Plot
Taylor (Getty) and Ashley (Arquette), best friends since childhood, are drifters, going across country, pulling low-level cons. They end up in Fairfield, CT, where they embark on a bigger scheme: to scam wealthy, as well as lonely, housewives.

Cast
 David Arquette as Ash 
 Thora Birch as  April 
 Balthazar Getty as Taylor 
 Julianna Margulies as Karen
 Joely Fisher as Emma
  Michael Janik  as Dickson
 Svetlana Metkina as Fast Bobby
 Lillo Brancato as DJ
 Katie Chonacas as Ruby
  Sara Colton  as Constance
 Kat Coiro as Tina (credited as Katherine Cunningham-Eves)
  Spencer Diamond  as Tracey
  Patrick Dizney  as Gerry
  Rachel Konstantin  as Candice 
  Andrea Leigh  as Joy
  Eric Rath  as Banker
 Krysten Ritter as Beth
  Irene Walsh as Suzanne

References

External links

2000s crime films
American crime films
Films directed by Jay Alaimo
2000s English-language films
2000s American films